Pirotan Island (also known as Pirotan) is an island in the Marine National Park, Arabian Sea. It consists of mangroves and low-tide beaches, and has an area of 3 square kilometres. Rozi island is located about 10 kilometres to the southeast.

Of the 42 islands in the park, Pirotan Island is the most popular and is one of the two islands where visitors are normally permitted. Visitation is strictly limited, permission is required from the Forest Department, Customs Department and the Ports.  The mangroves consist mainly of species of Rhizophora, Avicennia and Ceriops.

History
The island derived its name from Pirotan Patan, the ancient city probably at the place of Bedi Bandar.

In 1867 a flagpole was placed at the northern tip of the island to aid in navigation. In 1898 it was replaced with a 21-metre masonry lighthouse, which in turn was replaced in 1955–57 with a  lighthouse tower. In 1996, the lighthouse power was converted from diesel generator to solar power. The diesel generators  exist for backup  generation.

The island along surrounding coral reefs covering an area of 3 square kilometres was notified as part of Marine National Park in 1982.

Population
The only people there on the island are the forest guard, the lighthouse people and the Mujhavar (Server) at the Holy Saint Khwaja Khizer R.A. shrine (Durgah). The sacred shrine of Khwaja Khijer Rahmatullahialaih is located on the island.

Most visitors come in the morning with the high tide and leave by evening. Weekends in winters may bring more than 200–300 visitors.

Visiting Pirotan
The island being protected marine park, several permissions are required for visiting.  For Indian Nationals, permission from local Forest Department, Customs Department & Ports Department.  Foreign nationals additionally require permission from the police office.

There is no routine ferry service to the island.  One has to hire boats from the port. These boats take about 1.5 hours to reach the island. Since the beach is very shallow, the boats can only reach the island during high tide and leave the island during high tide.

Fauna

Marine
Marine life-forms found include:

Plus there are Saw-scaled Vipers & Scorpions too

Sea-birds
Pelicans
Sea Gull
Harring Gull
Blackheaded Gull
Crab Plover
Different types of waders

Gallery

Notes

External links

 Tourist information www.jamnagar.org/mnp.htm
 "Jamnagar-Pirotan-Island" Jamnagar News - Pirotan
 "Pirotan Island" Pirotan

Islands of the Arabian Sea
Islands of Gujarat
Lighthouses completed in 1898
1898 establishments in India
Lighthouses in India
Jamnagar district
Tourist attractions in Jamnagar district
Islands of India
Populated places in India